This is a list of law enforcement agencies in the U.S. state of Georgia.

According to the US Bureau of Justice Statistics' 2008 Census of State and Local Law Enforcement Agencies, the state had 628 law enforcement agencies employing 26,551 sworn police officers, about 274 for each 100,000 residents.

Georgia also hosts the FLETC, which serves as the primary training facility for numerous federal law enforcement agencies.

State agencies 
Georgia Department of Juvenile Justice (DJJ)
 Georgia Bureau of Investigation (GBI)
 Georgia Department of Corrections
 Georgia Department of Human Resource and Developmental Disabilities
 Georgia Department of Natural Resources
 Georgia Department of Public Safety
 Executive Security
 Georgia Capitol Police
 Georgia Motor Carrier Compliance Division
 Georgia State Patrol
Georgia Department of Revenue
Georgia Alcohol and Tobacco Division
Office of Special Investigations
Georgia Public Defender Council
 Georgia Department of Transportation
 Georgia Insurance and Safety Fire Commissioner
 Georgia Ports Authority Police Department
 Georgia World Congress Center Department of Public Safety
 The Medical Center, Navicent Health Police Department
 Stone Mountain Department of Public Safety

County marshal agencies 
Cherokee County Marshal's Office
Clayton County Marshal's Office
Columbia County Marshal's Office
DeKalb County Marshal's Office
Fayette County Marshal's Office
Fulton County Marshal's Office
Gwinnett County Marshal's Office
Hall County Marshal's Office
Paulding County Marshal's Office
Richmond County Marshal's Office
Troup County Marshal's Office

County sheriff agencies 

Appling County Sheriff's Office  
Atkinson County Sheriff's Office
Bacon County Sheriff's Office 
Baker County Sheriff's Office 
Baldwin County Sheriff's Office
Banks County Sheriff's Office 
Barrow County Sheriff's Office 
Bartow County Sheriff's Office 
Ben Hill County Sheriff's Office 
Berrien County Sheriff's Office 
Bibb County Sheriff's Office 
Bleckley County Sheriff's Office
Brantley County Sheriff's Office
Brooks County Sheriff's Office
Bryan County Sheriff's Office
Bulloch County Sheriff's Office
Burke County Sheriff's Office
Butts County Sheriff's Office 
Calhoun County Sheriff's Office
Camden County Sheriff's Office
Candler County Sheriff's Office
Carroll County Sheriff's Office
Catoosa County Sheriff's Office
Charlton County Sheriff's Office
Chatham County Sheriff's Office
Chattahoochee County Sheriff's Office
Chattooga County Sheriff's Office
Cherokee County Sheriff's Office  
Clarke County Sheriff's Office
Clay County Sheriff's Office
Clayton County Sheriff's Office
Clinch County Sheriff's Office
Cobb County Sheriff's Office 
Coffee County Sheriff's Office
Colquitt County Sheriff's Office
Columbia County Sheriff's Office
Cook County Sheriff's Office
Coweta County Sheriff's Office
Crawford County Sheriff's Office
Crisp County Sheriff's Office
Dade County Sheriff's Office
Dawson County Sheriff's Office
Decatur County Sheriff's Office
DeKalb County Sheriff's Office 
Dodge County Sheriff's Office
Dooly County Sheriff's Office
Dougherty County Sheriff's Office 
Douglas County Sheriff's Office
Early County Sheriff's Office
Echols County Sheriff's Office
Effingham County Sheriff's Office
Elbert County Sheriff's Office
Emanuel County Sheriff's Office
Evans County Sheriff's Office
Fannin County Sheriff's Office
Fayette County Sheriff's Office
Floyd County Sheriff's Office 
Forsyth County Sheriff's Office
Franklin County Sheriff's Office
Fulton County Sheriff's Office
Gilmer County Sheriff's Office
Glascock County Sheriff's Office
Glynn County Sheriff's Office
Gordon County Sheriff's Office
Grady County Sheriff's Office
Greene County Sheriff's Office
Gwinnett County Sheriff's Office
Habersham County Sheriff's Office
Hall County Sheriff's Office
Hancock County Sheriff's Office
Haralson County Sheriff's Office
Harris County Sheriff's Office
Hart County Sheriff's Office
Heard County Sheriff's Office
Henry County Sheriff's Office
Houston County Sheriff's Office
Irwin County Sheriff's Office
Jackson County Sheriff's Office
Japser County Sheriff's Office
Jeff Davis County Sheriff's Office

Jefferson County Sheriff's Office
Jenkins County Sheriff's Office
Johnson County Sheriff's Office
Jones County Sheriff's Office
Lamar County Sheriff's Office
Lanier County Sheriff's Office
Laurens County Sheriff's Office
Lee County Sheriff's Office
Liberty County Sheriff's Office
Lincoln County Sheriff's Office
Long County Sheriff's Office
Lowndes County Sheriff's Office
Lumpkin County Sheriff's Office
Macon County Sheriff's Office
Madison County Sheriff's Office
Marion County Sheriff's Office
McDuffie County Sheriff's Office
McIntosh County Sheriff's Office
Meriwether County Sheriff's Office
Miller County Sheriff's Office
Mitchell County Sheriff's Office
Monroe County Sheriff's Office
Montgomery County Sheriff's Office
Morgan County Sheriff's Office
Murray County Sheriff's Office
Muscogee County Sheriff's Office
Newton County Sheriff's Office
Oconee County Sheriff's Office
Oglethorpe County Sheriff's Office
Paulding County Sheriff's Office 
Peach County Sheriff's Office
Pickens County Sheriff's Office
Pierce County Sheriff's Office
Pike County Sheriff's Office
Polk County Sheriff's Office
Pulaski County Sheriff's Office
Putnam County Sheriff's Office
Quitman County Sheriff's Office 
Rabun County Sheriff's Office
Randolph County Sheriff's Office
Richmond County Sheriff's Office
Rockdale County Sheriff's Office
Schley County Sheriff's Office
Screven County Sheriff's Office
Seminole County Sheriff's Office
Spalding County Sheriff's Office
Stephens County Sheriff's Office
Stewart County Sheriff's Office
Sumter County Sheriff's Office
Talbot County Sheriff's Office
Taliaferro County Sheriff's Office
Tattnall County Sheriff's Office
Taylor County Sheriff's Office
Telfair County Sheriff's Office
Terrell County Sheriff's Office
Thomas County Sheriff's Office
Tift County Sheriff's Office
Toombs County Sheriff's Office
Towns County Sheriff's Office
Treutlen County Sheriff's Office
Troup County Sheriff's Office
Turner County Sheriff's Office
Twiggs County Sheriff's Office
Union County Sheriff's Office
Upson County Sheriff's Office
Walker County Sheriff's Office
Walton County Sheriff's Office
Ware County Sheriff's Office
Warren County Sheriff's Office
Washington County Sheriff's Office
Wayne County Sheriff's Office
Webster County Sheriff's Office
Wheeler County Sheriff's Office
White County Sheriff's Office
Whitfield County Sheriff's Office
Wilcox County Sheriff's Office
Wilkes County Sheriff's Office
Wilkinson County Sheriff's Office
Worth County Sheriff's Office

County police agencies 

Athens-Clarke County Police Department
Chatham County Police Department
Clayton County Police Department
Cobb County Police Department
DeKalb County Police Department
Dougherty County Police Department
Floyd County Police Department 
Fulton County Police Department
Glynn County Police Department
Gwinnett County Police Department
Henry County Police Department
Polk County Police Department

City agencies 

Abbeville Police Department 
Acworth Police Department
Adairsville Police Department
Adel Police Department
Adrian Police Department
Alamo Police Department
Albany Police Department
Alma Police Department
Alpharetta Police Department
Alto Police Department
Americus Police Department
Aragon Police Department 
Arcade Police Department
Arlington Police Department 
Ashburn Police Department
Atlanta Police Department
Auburn Police Department
Austell Police Department
Avondale Estates Police Department
Bainbridge Police Department
Baldwin Police Department
Ball Ground Police Department
Barnsville Police Department 
Bartow Police Department
Barwick Police Department
Baxely Police Department 
Berlin Police Department
Blackshear Police Department
Blakely Police Department
Bloomingdale Police Department
Blue Ridge Police Department
Boston Police Department
Bowdon Police Department 
Braselton Police Department
Braswell Police Department
Bremen Police Department
Brookhaven Police Department
Brooklet Police Department
Broxton Police Department
Brunswick Police Department
Buchanan Police Department
Buena Vista Police Department
Butler Police Department 
Byron Police Department
Cairo Police Department
Calhoun Police Department
Camilla Police Department
Canon Police Department
Canton Police Department
Carrollton Police Department
Cartersville Police Department
Cave Spring Police Department
Cedartown Police Department
Centerville Police Department
Chamblee Police Department
Chatsworth Police Department
Chattahoochee Hills Police Department
Chickamauga Police Department
Clarkesville Police Department
Clarkston Police Department
Claxton Police Department
Clayton Police Department
Cleveland Police Department 
Cochran Police Department
Cohutta Police Department
College Park Police Department
Collins Police Department
Colquitt Police Department
Columbus Police Department
Comer Police Department
Commerce Police Department
Conyers Police Department
Cordele Police Department
Cornelia Police Department
Covington Police Department
Crawfordville Police Department 
Cumming Police Department
Cuthbert Police Department
Dallas Police Department
Dalton Police Department
Dawson Police Department
Decatur Police Department
Demorest Police Department
Dillard Police Department
Doerun Police Department
Donalsonville Police Department
Doraville Police Department
Douglas Police Department
Douglasville Police Department
Dublin Police Department
Duluth Police Department
Dunwoody Police Department
East Ellijay Police Department
East Point Police Department
Eatonton Police Department
Edison Police Department
Elberton Police Department
Ellaville Police Department
Ellijay Police Department
Emerson Police Department
Eton Police Department
Euharlee Police Department
Fairburn Police Department
Fairmount Police Department
Fayetteville Police Department
Fitzgerald Police Department
Flowery Branch Police Department
Folkston Police Department
Forest Park Police Department
Forsyth Police Department
Fort Gaines Police Department
Fort Oglethorpe Police Department
Fort Valley Police Department
Franklin Police Department
Gainesville Police Department
Garden City Police Department
Georgetown Police Department
Glennville Police Department
Gordon Police Department
Grantville Police Department
Greensboro Police Department
Greenville Police Department
Griffin Police Department
Grovetown Police Department
Guyton Police Department
Hagan Police Department
Hahira Police Department
Hampton Police Department
Hapeville Police Department
Harlem Police Department
Hartwell Police Department
Hawkinsville Police Department
Hazlehurst Police Department
Helena Police Department
Hephzibah Police Department
Hinesville Police Department
Hiram Police Department
Hoboken Police Department
Hogansville Police Department
Holly Springs Police Department
Homerville Police Department
Ideal Police Department
Ivey Police Department
Jackson Police Department
Jacksonville Police Department
Jasper Police Department
Jefferson Police Department
Jeffersonville Police Department
Jesup Police Department
Johns Creek Police Department
Jonesboro Police Department
Kennesaw Police Department
Kingsland Police Department
Kingston Police Department
LaGrange Police Department
Lafayette Police Department
Lake City Police Department
 
Lake Park Police Department
Lakeland Police Department
Lavonia Police Department
Lawrenceville Police Department
Leesburg Police Department
Lenox Police Department
Leslie Police Department
Lilburn Police Department
Lincolnton Police Department
Lithonia Police Department
Locust Grove Police Department
Loganville Police Department
Lookout Mountain Police Department
Louisville Police Department
Ludowici Police Department
Lumber City Police Department
Lumpkin Police Department
Lyons Police Department
Madison Police Department
Manchester Police Department
Marietta Police Department
Marshallville Police Department
McCaysville Police Department
McDonough Police Department
McRae Police Department
Meigs Police Department
Metter Police Department
Midway Police Department
Milledgeville Police Department
Millen Police Department
Milner Police Department
Milton Police Department
Monroe Police Department
Montezuma Police Department
Monticello Police Department
Morrow Police Department
Morven Police Department
Moultrie Police Department
Mount Vernon Police Department
Mount Zion Police Department
Mountain City Police Department
Nahunta Police Department
Nashville Police Department
Nelson Police Department
Newington Police Department
Newnan Police Department
Newton Police Department
Nicholls Police Department
Norcross Police Department
Norman Park Police Department
Oakwood Police Department
Ocilla Police Department
Oglethorpe Police Department
Omega Police Department
Oxford Police Department
Palmetto Police Department
Pavo Police Department
Peachtree City Police Department
Pearson Police Department
Pelham Police Department
Pembroke Police Department
Pendergrass Police Department
Perry Police Department
Pine Lake Police Department
Pine Mountain Police Department
Pineview Police Department
Plains Police Department
Pooler Police Department
Port Wentworth Police Department
Portal Police Department
Porterdale Police Department
Powder Springs Police Department
Quitman Police Department
Ray City Police Department
Reidsville Police Department
Remerton Police Department
Reynolds Police Department
Rhine Police Department
Richland Police Department
Richmond Hill Police Department
Rincon Police Department
Ringgold Police Department
Riverdale Police Department
Rochelle Police Department
Rockmart Police Department
Rome Police Department
Rossville Police Department
Roswell Police Department
Royston Police Department
Sandy Springs Police Department
Sardis Police Department
Savannah Police Department
Senoia Police Department
Shiloh Police Department
Sky Valley Police Department
Smyrna Police Department
Snellville Police Department
Social Circle Police Department
Soperton Police Department
South Fulton Police Department
Sparta Police Department
Sparta Police Department
Springfield Police Department
St. Marys Police Department
Statesboro Police Department
Statham Police Department
Stockbridge Police Department
Stone Mountain Police Department
Stonecrest Police Department
Summerville Police Department
Suwanee Police Department
Sycamore Police Department
Sylvania Police Department
Sylvester Police Department
Talbotton Police Department
Tallahassee Police Department
Temple Police Department
Tennille Police Department
Thomaston Police Department
Thomasville Police Department
Thomson Police Department
Thunderbolt Police Department
Tifton Police Department
Toccoa Police Department
Trenton Police Department
Trion Police Department
Tunnel Hill Police Department
Twin City Police Department
Tybee Island Police Department
Tyrone Police Department
Unadilla Police Department
Union City Police Department
Union Point Police Department
Valdosta Police Department
Varnell Police Department
Vidalia Police Department
Vienna Police Department
Villa Rica Police Department
Wadley Police Department
Warner Robins Police Department
Warrenton Police Department
Warwick Police Department
Watkinsville Police Department
Waverly Hall Police Department
Waycross Police Department
Waynesboro Police Department
West Point Police Department
Whigham Police Department
White Police Department
Willacoochee Police Department
Winder Police Department
Winterville Police Department
Woodbury Police Department
Woodland Police Department
Woodstock Police Department
Wrens Police Department
Wrightsville Police Department
Zebulon Police Department

College and university agencies 

Abraham Baldwin Agricultural College Police
Agnes Scott College Department of Public Safety
Augusta University Police 
Berry College Police Department
Clark Atlanta University Department of Public Safety
Clayton State University Department of Public Safety
Columbus State University Police Department
Dalton State College Public Safety and Campus Police
Emory University Police Department
Georgia Gwinnett College Public Safety
Georgia Institute of Technology Police Department
Georgia Piedmont Technical College Police
Georgia Southern University Police Department
Georgia State University Police Department

Gordon State College Public Safety
Gwinnett Technical College Police Department
Kennesaw State University Department of Public Safety & University Police
Mercer University Police Department
Morehouse College Police Department
Middle Georgia State University Police Department
Reinhardt University Public Safety
Savannah State University Department of Public Safety
Spelman College Department of Public Safety
University of Georgia Police Department
University of North Georgia Department of Public Safety
University of West Georgia Police Department
Valdosta State University Police Department
Wiregrass Georgia Technical College Police Department

Board of Education agencies 
Athens-Clarke County School Police
Atlanta Public School Police Department
Bibb County School Police
Burke County Schools Campus Police
Clayton County School Police
Cherokee County School Police
Cobb County School Police
Columbia County Schools Police
Dekalb County Schools Department of Public Safety
Fulton County School Police
Glynn County Schools Police
Gwinnett County School Police
Richmond County Board of Education Police Department
Savannah-Chatham County School Police
Muscogee County School District Police Department

Transit authority police 
  MARTA Police Department

Other agencies 
Albany-Dougherty Drug Unit

Defunct agencies 
Macon Police Department - merged with the Bibb County Sheriff's Office in 2015. 
Oak Park Police Department disbanded April 2019 
Augusta Police Department merged with the Richmond County Sheriff's Office after the city and county governments consolidated in 1996. The Augusta Police Department provided all policing services within the City of Augusta while the Richmond County Sheriff's Office provided policing in the unincorporated areas of Richmond County.
Savannah-Chatham Metropolitan Police Department split in June 2017 between the Savannah Police Department and the Chatham County Police Department.

References

Georgia
Law enforcement agencies of Georgia (U.S. state)
Law enforcement agencies